Spencer Banks (born 1954 in Chesterfield) is a British television actor.

He was mainly active in the 1970s, when he tended to play a geeky adolescent in glasses. He starred in two significant programmes: the popular children's science fiction serial Timeslip as Simon Randall, and the Play for Today Penda's Fen (1974) by David Rudkin directed by Alan Clarke. He also appeared in television series including Alexander the Greatest, The Witch's Daughter, Tightrope, The Georgian House, Crossroads and Backs to the Land, films such as Diamonds on Wheels (1973) and A Christmas Carol (1984), and a 1981 radio version of The Chrysalids. In 2015 he appeared as 'Reverend Simon Randall' in The Amityville Playhouse opposite former Timeslip co-star Cheryl Burfield.

Filmography

Television

Film

References

External links 

Spencer Banks (Simon Randall) at Timeslip.org

1954 births
Living people
English male television actors
People from Chesterfield, Derbyshire